DXGH (531 AM) is a relay station of DZRH, owned and operated by Manila Broadcasting Company through its licensee Pacific Broadcasting System. The station's transmitter is located at Brgy. Dadiangas West, General Santos.

References

External links
DZRH FB Page
DZRH Website

Radio stations in General Santos
DZRH Nationwide stations
Radio stations established in 1993